Wednesday Theatre is a 1960s Australian anthology show which aired on the ABC.

Many of the episodes were imported from the BBC. However a number of episodes were made locally.

Episodes

1965

1966

1967

1968

1969
Wednesday Theatre in 1969 was a short run, and consisted almost exclusively of repeats.

References

External links
Wednesday Theatre at AustLit

Australian anthology television series
Australian Broadcasting Corporation original programming
1960s Australian television series